Miljan Jablan (born 30 January 1985) is a Serbian footballer who plays for Slovenian club Drava Ptuj.

Career
In February 2014, Jablan signed for Kazakhstan Premier League side FC Kaisar.

Honours
Alashkert
Armenian Premier League: 2017–18
Armenian Cup Runner-up: 2017–18
Armenian Supercup Runner-up: 2017–18

Sūduva
Lithuanian Football Cup Runner-up: 2016

References

External links
 

1985 births
Living people
People from Vrbas, Serbia
Serbian footballers
Association football defenders
Serbian expatriate footballers
FK Srbobran players
FK Sileks players
FK Spartak Subotica players
FK ČSK Čelarevo players
RFK Novi Sad 1921 players
FK Proleter Novi Sad players
FC Neman Grodno players
FC Kaisar players
FC Akzhayik players
FK Borac Čačak players
FK Sūduva Marijampolė players
OFK Titograd players
FC Alashkert players
FK Kabel players
NK Drava Ptuj (2004) players
A Lyga players
Kazakhstan Premier League players
Montenegrin First League players
Belarusian Premier League players
Serbian First League players
Serbian SuperLiga players
Slovenian Second League players
Expatriate footballers in North Macedonia
Expatriate footballers in Belarus
Expatriate footballers in Kazakhstan
Expatriate footballers in Lithuania
Expatriate footballers in Montenegro
Expatriate footballers in Armenia
Expatriate footballers in Slovenia
Serbian expatriate sportspeople in North Macedonia
Serbian expatriate sportspeople in Belarus
Serbian expatriate sportspeople in Kazakhstan
Serbian expatriate sportspeople in Lithuania
Serbian expatriate sportspeople in Montenegro
Serbian expatriate sportspeople in Armenia
Serbian expatriate sportspeople in Slovenia